Giannota is a village and a community of the Elassona municipality. Before the 2011 local government reform it was a part of the municipality of Sarantaporo, of which it was a municipal district. The 2011 census recorded 261 inhabitants in the village. The community of Giannota covers an area of 26.989 km2.

History
The settlement is recorded as village and as "Yanota" in the Ottoman Tahrir Defter number 101 dating to 1521.

Economy
The population of Giannota is occupied in animal husbandry and agriculture.

Population
According to the 2011 census, the population of the settlement of Giannota was 261 people, a decrease of almost 42% compared with the population of the previous census of 2001.

See also
 List of settlements in the Larissa regional unit

References

Populated places in Larissa (regional unit)